Senator Clifford may refer to:

Eugene A. Clifford (1886–1941), Wisconsin State Senate
John H. Clifford (1809–1876), Massachusetts State Senate